Edward Whalen may refer to:

 Ed Whalen (broadcaster) (1927–2001), Canadian broadcaster and journalist
 Ed Whalen (ice hockey) (fl. 1910s), ice hockey player

See also
 Edward Whelan (disambiguation)